Keysville is an unincorporated community in southeastern Hillsborough County, Florida, United States, adjacent to Lithia.

Geography
Keysville is located at 27.9 degrees north, 82.1 degrees west (27.86889, -82.09583); or about 12 miles south of Plant City. The elevation for the community is 81 feet above sea level.

History
Keysville was founded in the 1870s by Daniel McQueen Blue. It was named after the US postmaster general at the time, General David Key. In 1880, Keysville reached a population of over 500, making it the second largest community in the county, after Tampa. In the late nineteenth century it was served by passenger trains, but after the depletion of the timber resources, it declined. In the early 1900s the town experienced a small revival with the opening of numerous phosphate mines in the area.

Education
The community of Keysville is served by Hillsborough County Schools.

References

External links
Keysville profile from Hometown Locator

Unincorporated communities in Hillsborough County, Florida
Unincorporated communities in Florida